Sir Michael Creagh (died 1738) was an Irish politician and soldier.

Although a Protestant, he was a Jacobite supporter of the Catholic James II. He was Lord Mayor of Dublin from 1688 to 1689 and received James II on his arrival to the city in March 1689. He was a Member of Parliament for Dublin City in the Patriot Parliament in 1689. He raised an infantry regiment at his own expense to serve in the Irish Army during the War of the Two Kings (1689–91), which was present at the Battle of the Boyne. 

Following the Jacobite defeat in Ireland, Creagh was attainted and fled to France and then to the Netherlands. He had returned to Ireland by the mid–1720s and turned his attention to regaining his confiscated estates. He converted from Roman Catholicism to the established Church of Ireland and became a broadsheet publisher. Creagh failed in his attempt to regain his confiscated properties and had to be helped from the public funds in 1732, 1733, and 1734. He died intestate in 1738.

References

Year of birth unknown
1738 deaths
Irish Jacobites
Irish knights
Irish soldiers
Year of death unknown
Lord Mayors of Dublin
Irish soldiers in the army of James II of England
Members of the Parliament of Ireland (pre-1801) for County Dublin constituencies
Irish MPs 1689
Protestant Jacobites